"It Won't Be Long Before We're Home" is a World War I song in the style of a march. It was written by Paul Cunningham and composed by Joseph E. Howard. This song was published in 1918 by M. Witmark & Sons, in New York, NY.

The sheet music cover depicts a soldier celebrating standing on a battlefield with German helmets and an inset photo of Joseph E. Howard along with a note that the song was used in the Song Bird Review.

The sheet music can be found at the Pritzker Military Museum & Library.

References

Bibliography
Parker, Bernard S. World War I Sheet Music 1. Jefferson: McFarland & Company, Inc., 2007. . 
Vogel, Frederick G. World War I Songs: A History and Dictionary of Popular American Patriotic Tunes, with Over 300 Complete Lyrics. Jefferson: McFarland & Company, Inc., 1995. . 

1918 songs
Songs of World War I
Songs written by Joseph E. Howard